The Sea of Sardinia is a body of water in the Mediterranean Sea between the Spanish archipelago of Balearic Islands and the Italian island of Sardinia.

The deepest point is at some 3,000 m, some 150 km north-west to the island of Menorca.

Recognition
The International Hydrographic Organization defines the area as generic Mediterranean Sea, in the Western Basin. It does not recognize the label Sea of Sardinia.

See also 
 Balearic Sea

Notes

Sardinian
Landforms of Sardinia
Seas of Italy